The  is a Japanese theater award given by the publisher Hakusuisha in honor of the playwright Kunio Kishida. It was begun in 1955 to honor new playwrights, and is known in Japan as the gateway to recognition for contemporary playwrights.

List of winners

1955–1960
 1955 - Not awarded
Honorable mention:  Seiichi Yashiro
 1957 - Not awarded
Honorable mention: 
 1958 - Hotta Hotta Kiyomi for 
 1959 - Not awarded

1961–1970
 1961 - Not awarded
 1963 - Masakazu Yamazaki for 
 1965 - Not awarded
 1969 - Satoshi Akihama for  ua
 1970 - Juro Kara for

1971–1980
 1971 - Makoto Sato for 
 1972 - Hisashi Inoue to 
 1975 - Not awarded
Honorable mention:  Tomiko Ishizawa
 1976 - Tomiko Ishizawa for 
 1977 - Not awarded
 1978 - Shōgo Oda  and Seishin Chinen for 
 1979 - Kodai Okabe for 
 1980 - Ren Saitō for

1981–1990
 1981 - Jūichirō Takeuchi for 
 1984 - Sō Kitamura for 
 1985 - Rio Kishida for 
 1986 - Takeshi Kawamura  for 
 1987 - Not awarded
 1988 - Yasuhiko Ohashi for 
 1989 - Riyo Iwamatsu for 
 1990 - Not awarded

1991–2000
 1991 - Yōji Sakate for 
 1992 - Kensuke Yokouchi for 
 1994 - Yoshinobu Tei for 
 1997 - Suzuki Matsuo for 
 1998 - Fukatsu Shigefumi for 
 1999 - Keralino Sandorovich (KERA) for 
 2000 - Ai Nagai for

2001–2010
 2001 - Kōki Mitani for 
 2002 - Not awarded
 2003 - Kazuki Nakashima for 
 2004 - Yutaka Kuramochi for 
 2007 - Not awarded
 2008 - Shirō Maeda for 
 2010 - Yukio Shiba for

2010s
 2011 - Shū Matsui for 
 2014 - Ameya Norimizu for Blue Sheet
 2015 - Kenji Yamauchi for Troisgros (トロワグロ)
 2016 - Kuro Tanino for The Dark Inn (地獄谷温泉 無明ノ宿)
 2017 - Makoto Ueda for This New World that Had to Come (来てけつかるべき新世界)
 2018 - Kamisato Yūdai for Valparaiso no nagai saka o kudaru hanashi (バルパライソの長い坂をくだる話) and Fukuhara Mitsunori for Atarashii explosion (あたらしいエクスプロージョン)
 2019 - Shuntaro Matsubara for "Yamayama" (I Would Prefer Not To)
 2020 - Satoko Ichihara for "The Bacchae – Holstein Milk Cows"; and Kenichi Tani for "Fukushima Trilogy"

References

External links
 http://www.hakusuisha.co.jp/kishida/list.php 

Japanese awards
Japanese theatre awards